The  2018 Moscow mayoral election was held on 9 September 2018, on common election day. To be elected, a candidate must get more than 50% of votes. If no one achieves 50%, a runoff will be held 14 days later. Only the two most successful candidates from the first round participate in the second round.

Sergey Sobyanin, the incumbent Mayor of Moscow, was re-elected for a new term.

Candidates

Nomination and registration of candidates
Candidates can be nominated both by political parties and as self-nomination.

In any case, candidates must pass the "municipal filter" (collection of signatures of municipal deputies). According to the decision of Moscow City Election Commission from 4 June 2018, the number of signatures of municipal deputies in support of a candidate must be in the range of from 110 to 115.

Candidates nominated by the self-nomination procedure, in addition to the signatures of municipal deputies, it is also necessary to collect signatures of voters. The number of signatures of voters should be in the range from 36,081 to 39,689.

Registered candidate
Initially, four candidates were registered to participate in the election, but on 23 July, the Moscow City Court ordered the City Election Commission to register one more candidate. Thus, five candidates were registered to participate in the election.

Other candidates

Opinion polls

Result

|- style="background-color:#E9E9E9;text-align:center;"
! style="text-align:left;" colspan="2"| Candidate
! style="text-align:left;" colspan="2"| Party
! width="75"|Votes
! width="30"|%
|-
| style="background-color:;"|
| style="text-align:left;"| Sergey Sobyanin
| style="text-align:left;" colspan="2"| Independent
| 
| 70.17
|-
| style="background-color:;"|
| style="text-align:left;"| Vadim Kumin
| style="text-align:left;"| Communist Party
| CPRF
| 
| 11.38
|-
| style="background-color:;"|
| style="text-align:left;"| Ilya Sviridov
| style="text-align:left;"| A Just Russia
| JR
| 
| 7.01
|-
| style="background-color:;"|
| style="text-align:left;"| Mikhail Degtyarev
| style="text-align:left;"| Liberal Democratic Party
| LDPR
| 
| 6.72
|-
|bgcolor=#287319|
| style="text-align:left;"| Mikhail Balakin
| style="text-align:left;"| Union of Citizens
|UC
| 
| 1.87
|-
| style="background-color:#E9E9E9;" colspan="6"|
|- style="font-weight:bold"
| style="text-align:left;" colspan="4"| Total
| 
|100.00
|-
| style="background-color:#E9E9E9;" colspan="6"|
|-
| style="text-align:left;" colspan="4"| Valid votes
| 
| 97.15
|-
| style="text-align:left;" colspan="4"| Blank ballots
| 
| 2.85
|-
| style="text-align:left;" colspan="4"| Turnout
| 
| 30.91
|-
| style="text-align:left;" colspan="4"| Registered voters
| 
| style="background-color:#E9E9E9;"|
|-
| style="background-color:#E9E9E9;" colspan="6"|
|-
| style="text-align:left;font-size:90%;" colspan="6"|
Official results published by the Moscow City Electoral Commission 
|}

Notes

References

2018 in Moscow
Mayoral elections in Moscow
Moscow
September 2018 events in Russia